Harry Lindbäck (19 December 1926 – 9 August 2010) was a Swedish sprint canoer who competed in the early 1950s. At the 1952 Summer Olympics in Helsinki, he finished eighth in the C-2 10000 m event while being eliminated in the heats of the C-2 1000 m event.

References
Harry Lindbäck's profile at Sports Reference.com
Harry Lindbäck's profile at the Swedish Olympic Committee 

1926 births
2010 deaths
Canoeists at the 1952 Summer Olympics
Olympic canoeists of Sweden
Swedish male canoeists